The Oklahoma State Cowboys football program represents Oklahoma State University–Stillwater in college football. The team is a member of the Big 12 Conference and competes at the NCAA Division I Football Bowl Subdivision level. The Cowboys are led by Mike Gundy, who is in his 17th year as head coach. Oklahoma State plays its home games at Boone Pickens Stadium in Stillwater, Oklahoma.

History

Early history (1900–1962)
The Oklahoma A&M Aggies (also referred to as the Tigers) played their first season of football in 1900 and joined their first conference for the start of the 1915 season, the Southwest Conference. In 1925, the Oklahoma A&M program joined the Missouri Valley Intercollegiate Athletic Association. In 1928, the MVIAA split into the Big Six Conference and the Missouri Valley Conference. A&M was the only large school that joined the smaller MVC. Jim Lookabaugh led the Aggies for eleven seasons, which included a 9–0 campaign and a national championship in 1945 which followed an 8–1 season the year before. Lookabaugh was an OSU alum who lettered in multiple sports. In October 2016, Oklahoma State was retroactively awarded the 1945 national championship by the American Football Coaches Association (AFCA).  Lookabaugh stepped down after the 1949 season, finishing his tenure with a mark of 58–41–6. From 1950 to 1954, Jennings B. Whitworth coached at Oklahoma A&M, and compiled a 22–27–1 record, which included only one winning season, a 7–3 campaign in 1953. Whitworth departed A&M to accept the head coaching position at Alabama following the 1954 season. In 1951, Oklahoma A&M players and coaches caused the Johnny Bright incident, a violent on-field assault against an African American player from Drake University, Johnny Bright; Oklahoma A&M administration would attempt to cover up and deny the incident for over half a century.

Cliff Speegle took the reins of the Oklahoma A&M Cowboys. Under Speegle's tutelage, the Cowboys compiled a record of 36–42–3, which included three winning seasons from 1957 to 1959. The losing record, combined with an 0–8 mark against rival Oklahoma, resulted in Speegle's firing following the 1962 season. In 1956, A&M announced it was joining (or rejoining, depending on one's view) what had become the Big Seven for the 1958–59 academic year. As part of a transition period, the Cowboys went independent for two years.  On May 15, 1957, Oklahoma A&M changed its name to Oklahoma State University. They officially became a part of the renamed Big Eight Conference in 1958.

Phil Cutchin era (1963–1968)
Longtime Bear Bryant assistant Phil Cutchin led Oklahoma State to its first win over Oklahoma in 20 years, but failed to bring success to Stillwater, compiling a mark of 19–38–2. Cutchin was replaced by the OSU administration eager to see a winning product on the field.

Floyd Gass era (1969–1971)
Oklahoma State continued to struggle under head coach Floyd Gass, an OSU alum, who led the Cowboy football program for three seasons. During his tenure, he led the team to three straight losing seasons. Fan and administration support became increasingly hard to come by as the on-field production slipped. Despite the lack of football success, Gass would serve in multiple capacities at OSU, including athletics director for several years after his resignation as football coach.

Dave Smith era (1972)
The Cowboys were finally able to enjoy a winning season —their first in nine years—in 1974 under the leadership of head coach Dave Smith. However, Smith wouldn't stick around, as he departed for the head coaching position at SMU after just one season in Stillwater.

Jim Stanley era (1973–1978)

Jim Stanley, a two-time defensive coordinator at OSU, returned to Stillwater to become the head coach of the Cowboys in 1973. He coached them from 1973 to 1978, amassing a career record of 35–31–2. Stanley's Cowboys earned a Fiesta Bowl victory in 1974 and his 1976 team ended the season 9–3 finishing as a Big Eight co-champions on their way to a Tangerine Bowl victory. His success at Oklahoma State earned him many accolades, including being invited to coach three collegiate all-star games: the 1973 East–West Shrine Game, the 1977 Hula Bowl, and the 1977 Japan Bowl.

In 1978, the Big Eight Conference initiated an investigation into the OSU football program in response to allegations of violations of several NCAA rules and regulations while Stanley was head coach. Stanley successfully filed suit against the conference to require them to provide various due process protections in their final hearing on the charges.

Jimmy Johnson era (1979–1983)
In 1979, Jimmy Johnson got the head coaching job at Oklahoma State. Johnson's successful rebuilding of the inconsistent Cowboys football program is a hallmark in the long history of Cowboy football. In his final season, he led the Cowboys to an 8–4 record and a 24–14 victory over 20th-ranked Baylor in the Astro-Bluebonnet Bowl. The season included a season opening romp over then No. 12 ranked Arizona State in Tempe, and a Bedlam matchup between the No. 2 ranked Oklahoma Sooners and the No. 3-ranked Cowboys on November 24, 1984. A game in which the Cowboys ultimately lost, 24–14.

In 1984, when he was offered the head coaching job at Miami, Jimmy Johnson was unsure if he wanted to leave Stillwater. His good friend Larry Lacewell told Johnson that if he wanted to win a national championship and eventually coach in the NFL he had to take the Miami job. Johnson soon after accepted the head coaching job at Miami. Jimmy Johnson left OSU with an overall record of 29–25–3.

Pat Jones era (1984–1994)
Pat Jones was promoted from assistant coach to head coach following Johnson's departure. He served as head coach of the Oklahoma State Cowboys from 1984 to 1994 after five years as an assistant under Jimmy Johnson. During his 11 years at Oklahoma State, he compiled a 62–60–3 record, including a 3–1 bowl game record. Jones was named Big Eight Coach of the Year in both 1984 and 1992. From 1984 to 1988, Jones led the Cowboys to the most successful period in school history at the time. With a talented roster that included running backs Barry Sanders and Thurman Thomas, wide receiver Hart Lee Dykes and quarterback Mike Gundy, they went 44–15 over this five-year stretch, including the school's first three-year stretch of ten-win seasons.

Running back Barry Sanders played for the Cowboys from 1986 to 1988. During his first two seasons at Oklahoma State, he backed up All-American Thurman Thomas. In 1987, Sanders led the nation in yards per kickoff return (31.6), while also rushing for over 600 yards and scoring 8 touchdowns. Thomas moved on to the NFL, and Sanders became the starter for his junior year.

In 1988, in what has been called the greatest individual season in college football history, Sanders led the nation by averaging 7.6 yards per carry and over 200 yards per game, including rushing for over 300 yards in four games. Despite his massive workload of 344 carries, Sanders was still used as the team's punt and kickoff returner, adding another 516 yards on special teams. He set college football season records with 2,628 yards rushing, 3,248 total yards, 234 points, 39 touchdowns, 37 rushing touchdowns, 5 consecutive 200 yard games, scored at least 2 touchdowns in 11 consecutive games, and 9 times he scored at least 3 touchdowns. Sanders also ran for 222 yards and scored 5 touchdowns in his three quarters of action in the 1988 Holiday Bowl, a game that is not included in the official NCAA season statistics. Sanders learned of his Heisman Trophy win while he was with the team in Tokyo, Japan, preparing to face Texas Tech in the Coca-Cola Classic.  He chose to leave Oklahoma State before his senior season to enter the NFL draft.

Days after the 1988 season, Oklahoma State and the NCAA released the results of an unusual joint investigation into the football program. The investigation revealed several major violations dating prior to Johnson's tenure, principally involvement in a "bidding war" for Dykes out of high school. The Cowboys were banned from bowl games for three years and from live television for two years, and they were also limited to 20 scholarships from 1989 to 1992. Jones was not directly implicated in any wrongdoing; indeed, the investigation found that no violations had taken place in two years. He was unable to put together another winning team due to the sanctions, and left OSU after the 1994 season. In Jones' last six years, the Cowboys won only seven games in Big Eight play, including three seasons of winless conference records. Oklahoma State would need almost the entire decade of the 1990s to recover; with only one winning season coming between 1989 and 2001.

Bob Simmons era (1995–2000)
Bob Simmons came to OSU from his post as defensive line coach at Colorado to replace Jones. Simmons' teams were largely unsuccessful, and Simmons resigned under pressure following the 2000 season. His final record in Stillwater was 30–38 with just one winning campaign, an 8–4 season in 1997 that culminated in a loss in the Alamo Bowl. In 1996, OSU joined with the other Big Eight schools and four schools from the old Southwest Conference to form the Big 12 Conference.

Les Miles era (2001–2004)
After Simmons' resignation, a coaching search produced Dirk Koetter as the new head coach. Hours after accepting the job, Koetter reneged on his offer in order to coach at Arizona State.

The next two candidates were Les Miles, a former OSU offensive coordinator, and Mike Gundy, a former OSU player and coach. Miles was hired as head coach while Gundy was brought on as offensive coordinator. In his first year as head coach, Miles would achieve a 4–7 record. In the 2001 regular season finale, the underdog Cowboys would defeat the reigning National Champion Oklahoma Sooners in Norman 16–13. In 2002, Miles would post a 7–5 regular season record. The Cowboys again defeated the Oklahoma Sooners, this time in Stillwater. The team would go on to three straight bowl games in Miles's last three years as head coach ('02,'03,'04). Miles left after the 2004 season to take the head coaching position at LSU.

Mike Gundy era (2005–present)

Mike Gundy was promoted from offensive coordinator and named immediately as Miles' successor and the 22nd head coach at Oklahoma State. Gundy is one of three head football coaches at Oklahoma State to have played for Oklahoma State, along with Jim Lookabaugh and Floyd Gass. His first season saw the expulsion of 11 players from the team and the Cowboys struggled to a 4–7 record winning only one Big 12 conference game. In his second season, the Cowboy offense began to click and the Cowboys would finish 7–6 including a victory over the Alabama Crimson Tide in the Independence Bowl. In 2007, the Cowboys again posted a 6–6 regular season record and a bowl win over the Indiana Hoosiers in the Insight Bowl. After their second straight bowl appearance, Gundy was rewarded with a contract extension through the 2013 season.

After posting a 9–3 regular season record in 2008, Coach Gundy received a new seven-year contract worth $15.7 million. The contract, which extends through the 2015 season, was taken into effect on January 1, 2009. Gundy's tenure as head coach of the Cowboys has seen the rise and expansion of not only his football program, but the football facilities as well. The Cowboys began the 2009 season ranked No. 9 in the country in the AP Top 25, but the dreams of a miracle season were crushed when the Pokes lost 45–35 to the unranked Houston Cougars at home the following week, and later finding out that star wide receiver Dez Bryant was ruled ineligible for the remainder of the season, for lying to the NCAA about having contact with 8-time pro bowler Deion Sanders, which wasn't an NCAA violation in the first place. The following year, Oklahoma State hired Offensive Coordinator Dana Holgorsen from the University of Houston. In 2010 coach Gundy recorded the first ever 11-win season in Oklahoma State history. What was supposed to be a rebuilding year turned into the best in school history.

Under Gundy there have been a series of NFL quality wide receivers to come through Boone Pickens Stadium. These include Adarius Bowman, Dez Bryant, Justin Blackmon, James Washington, and Tylan Wallace. On December 3, 2011, the Cowboys won their first Big 12 Championship in school history with a 44–10 victory over rival Oklahoma in the Bedlam Series. The nationally third-ranked Cowboys eventually went on to win the Tostitos Fiesta Bowl by beating fourth-ranked Stanford in overtime, 41–38, on January 2, 2012. Early in the 2012 season, he notched his 63rd win as head coach, passing Jones as the winningest coach in school history. On October 29, 2016, Mike Gundy recorded his 100th victory as a head coach with a 37–20 win over # 10 West Virginia. In the process, notching his sixth victory over a top 10 ranked school. Gundy is the only Oklahoma State football coach to record 100 victories, and only the 6th coach to reach such a milestone with his current school. Oklahoma State beat Oklahoma in Bedlam on November 27, 2021 to reach 5th place in the AP poll coming into championship weekend where they were defeated by Baylor, 21-16, in the Big 12 Championship.

Conference affiliations
Independent (1901–1914, 1957–1959)
Southwest Conference (1915–1924)
MVIAA (1925–1927)
Missouri Valley Conference (1928–1956)
Big Eight Conference (1960–1995)
Big 12 Conference (1996–present)

Championships

National championships 
OSU has two national championships. The 2011 team was selected by NCAA-designated major selector Colley Matrix, though the Cowboys do not claim this title. In 2016, the AFCA committee (which conducts the Coaches Poll) retroactively selected the 1945 team. Oklahoma State claims the 1945 championship.

Conference championships 
The Cowboys have won ten conference championships, six outright and four shared.

† Co-champions

Division championships 
The Cowboys have won one division championship.

† Co-champions

Head coaches
Oklahoma State has had 22 head coaches since the 1901 inaugural season.

Bowl games
The Cowboys have played in 33 bowl games, garnering a record of 21–12. They are 5–4 in the six major bowl games (Rose, Peach, Cotton Bowl Classic, Sugar, Fiesta & Orange), with their biggest win being over Stanford in the 2012 Fiesta Bowl, with the win making them finish 3rd in the final poll, the highest ever finish for a Cowboy team.

Rivalries

Oklahoma

The first Bedlam game was held at Island Park in Guthrie, Oklahoma. It was a cold, and very windy day with the temperatures well below the freezing mark. At one moment in the game when the Oklahoma A&M Aggies were punting, the wind carried the ball backwards behind the kicker. If the Oklahoma A&M squad recovered the ball it would be a touchback and if the University of Oklahoma squad recovered it, it would be a touchdown. The ball kept going backwards and rolled down a hill into the half-frozen creek. Since a touchdown was at stake, members of both teams dove into the icy waters to recover the ball. A member of the OU team came out with the ball and downed it for a touchdown, eventually winning the game 75–0.[2] Thus was the beginning of Bedlam.

Author Steve Budin, whose father was a New York bookie, has recently publicized the claim that the 1954 "Bedlam" game against rival OU was fixed by mobsters in his book Bets, Drugs, and Rock & Roll. Allegedly, the mobsters threatened and paid off a cook to slip laxatives into a soup eaten by many OU Sooner starting players, causing them to fall violently ill in the days leading up to the game. OU was victorious in the end, but their 14–0 win did not cover the 20-point spread they had in their favor. However, many people involved in the 1954 contest do not recall any incident like the one purported by Budin to have occurred.

Tulsa

The Cowboys also have a rivalry with Tulsa. Oklahoma State leads Tulsa in the all-time series 43–28–5, winning the most recent match up in 2020, 16-7.  Since 1990 Tulsa is 3–10 versus Oklahoma State with the Cowboys scoring at least 36 points in four of the last five contests. The Cowboys have a twenty-game home winning streak against Tulsa. The last time Tulsa won in Stillwater was 1951.

Facilities
Oklahoma State plays in Boone Pickens Stadium in Stillwater, Oklahoma.  The original football field was inaugurated in 1913, and the first stand was built in 1920. At that time the field was repositioned from a north-south to an east-west configuration to avoid the strong prevailing winds of Northern Oklahoma. From 1914 until 2004, the stadium was named Lewis Field, named after popular professor and dean Laymon Lowery Lewis. Even though a stadium would not be built for six years after the field's inception, the students felt obliged to name their alma mater's field after their beloved "Dr. Lew".

By 1930 the capacity had risen to 13,000 and increased again in 1947. Major additions, including the first press box, brought the capacity to 30,000. In 1950 again seats were added and the total capacity increased to 39,000. The next renovations came in 1972 and for the next three decades the capacity hovered around 50,000.

In 2003, alumnus T. Boone Pickens made a historic donation to the university for improvements to its athletic facilities, and it was announced that the stadium would be renamed in his honor. The announcement of the renovation came after two consecutive victories over the Oklahoma Sooners in the Bedlam Series. To this day, Boone Pickens Stadium is one of a very few major college football stadiums with an east-west configuration. The latest renovation of the football stadium was completed in 2009, with the capacity at 60,218. In 2017, Oklahoma State renumbered and expanded the current seats, leaving the new capacity at 56,790 in an effort to increase seat width and improve the fan experience. In 2018, Oklahoma State installed a 6,160 square foot video board on the façade of Gallagher-Iba Arena in the stadium's east end zone. The jumbotron will be one of the ten largest in the country, placing it ahead of USC's jumbotron at Los Angeles Memorial Coliseum.

In 2007, plans to build the Sherman E. Smith Training Center were unveiled. The 92,000 square foot indoor practice facility was completed in 2013.

Allegations of misconduct by Sports Illustrated
 
On September 10, 2013, Sports Illustrated published the first of 5 stories alleging misconduct during Les Miles tenure and extending into the Mike Gundy era. Writers Thayer Evans and George Dohrmann reportedly engaged in a 10-month-long investigation into wrongdoing throughout the early-mid 2000s of the Oklahoma State football program. The first installment "The Money" made allegations of illicit gifts, overzealous boosters, no-show jobs, and a bounty system in place. The second installment, "The Academics" alleged academic fraud, steering athletes into easy pass or no-show classes, and grade tampering. The third installment, "The Drugs" painted a picture of a drug culture, in which the players were selling drugs, and the school did little to curtail drug usage. The fourth installment, "The Sex" was heavily edited by all accounts, considering its late online release time. This installment revealed a hostess program where the head coaches oversaw the application process, and writers implied the hostesses were expected to have sex with recruits. The final installment "The Fallout" told the tale of Artrell Woods, who had left school after a horrific accident from which he had recovered.

While at first shocking to fans and media, Oklahoma State immediately pledged transparency. Athletic Director Mike Holder held a press conference the day before the release and apologized for the bad publicity, and promised to investigate the claims. OSU then hired independent investigator, Charles Smrt to conduct a thorough investigation into the allegations. ESPN later debunked several of the claims in the story by simply calling OSU's registrar and obtaining a transcript from Tatum Bell that proved he was not in school during stated timelines. Further controversy began to surround the Sports Illustrated article when Jason Whitlock, a former colleague of Evans, claimed that he was a huge fan of the University of Oklahoma. Dohrmann went on national syndicated radio with Doug Gottlieb and stated that Fath' Carter had two degrees from OSU. When questioned by ESPN's Brett McMurphy, the registrars' office later stated that Fath' Carter had never graduated. Brandon Weeden also was able to point to unprofessional behavior from Evans displayed during a press conference. DeadSpin also found out that many crucial professors and tutors never were interviewed for the story.

In June 2014, John Talley, a spokesperson for the FCA chapter at Oklahoma State had filed a lawsuit against Dohrmann, Time Inc., and Evans for false-light accusations which painted him as an overzealous booster. In his lawsuit, Talley is seeking damages of $75,000. In July 2014, OSU confirmed that the NCAA had been investigating the allegations.

On October 21, 2014, the NCAA and The Compliance Group, an independent investigation firm led by Charles Smrt, jointly released a statement that the allegations contained in the Sports Illustrated story were "fundamentally unfounded". The NCAA and the investigator had pored over 50,000 emails and had unfettered access to all areas of the compliance department and re-interviewed those who were quoted in the story. The report stated "Overall, several interviewees indicated that they reported to SI general information or incidents about college football but that the SI reporter indicated that the incident occurred at OSU." During the joint investigation, however, three lesser allegations – not related to the Sports Illustrated claims, and labeled as Level II violations – were uncovered:

"During the period of fall 2007 through the spring of 2013, approximately 1,572 drug tests occurred of football players. There were 94 positives involving approximately 60 student-athletes per the policy. (According to the company used by the University to conduct its drug testing program, this positive rate per total number of tests is slightly less than the national average).

The institution examined the application of the policy in those 94 situations and believes that on four occasions, the applicable penalty per the policy was not applied and reported this information to the Enforcement Staff."

Also, it was deemed that the Orange Pride spirit program was chartered under the football program, but a recent NCAA policy change in 2007 required spirit clubs to form under the admissions department. Because of these two minor violations, OSU was cited for a failure to monitor in these two instances. The total cost for the independent investigation amounted to $221,055.18.

On January 22, 2015, Burns Hargis and other OSU officials visited the NCAA offices in Indianapolis to appeal to the NCAA. Even as Level II allegations, OSU officials considered them harsh and sought to have them reduced further. Hargis stated OSU's intent on having those Level II allegations reconsidered, possibly as Level III.

On April 24, 2015, the NCAA announced the sanctions against Oklahoma State would include an $8,500 fine and one-year probation to avoid further citings. The University self-imposed limits on the number of recruiting visits, off-campus evaluations, and the number of evaluation days in the fall and spring recruiting periods all of which will expire in 2016. The University is also not allowed to use the Orange Pride program to assist with recruiting visits for four years (2019–2020 season). No scholarships were reduced and no postseason bans were put into place.

Logos and uniforms
Throughout the 2000s, the Cowboys had four main uniform combinations. For the 2011 football season, it was revealed that Nike had created new uniforms for the Cowboys, offering three different helmet options in either gray, black, or white. New jerseys and pants consisting of black, orange, grey and white also came aboard, allowing for up to 48 different variations. The Cowboys debuted their new gray uniforms for the first game of the 2011 season. In a 2012 home game against Iowa State, the Cowboys debuted the new orange helmets, along with a new Pistol Pete decal. This would bring the different uniform combinations up to 64.

The uniform combinations are chosen before the season by a committee of players and the Cowboys equipment manager, Wes Edwards. A few patterns have evolved since the origination of the multiple uniform era. Thursday night games during 2009, 2010, 2011, and in 2014 have involved black uniforms. Another trend has the Cowboys reverting to the traditional White Helmet/Traditional Brand Logo/Orange Jersey/White Pants for the home opener in 2012, 2013, and 2014. Bowl games for the 2012 Fiesta Bowl, the 2013 Heart of Dallas Bowl, and the high-profile 2014 season opener in the Cowboys Classic featured Oklahoma State wearing all black.

During the 2012 season, fans saw the addition of the orange helmet, and the addition of new decals. For the first time since 1979, the Cowboys took the field in "All Orange" against Iowa State for Homecoming. Also during the 2012 season, new carbon fiber gray helmets replaced the matte gray that had been used in 2011. The Cowboys helmet logos  include a Pistol Pete logo, as well as what fans refer to as "Phantom Pete". The "OSU" Branded logo was now featured in different variants, to reflect the helmet being worn. During 2013, OSU began incorporating a stripe down the center of their helmets for different variations. In 2014, OSU revealed two new helmet choices- a "classic Aggie" which paid homage to the bucking Aggie logo used in the 1940s and 1950s when the school was still called Oklahoma A&M Aggies. The other helmet was an Orange-Chrome with an oversized, off-center Pistol Pete. This was worn in a Thursday night victory over Texas Tech.

Past uniforms

Paddle people
The student section has a tradition of hitting orange paddles on the sideline wall at home games. This tradition apparently started in the early 1990s, and has since become an official group within the university. The orange paddles have the word "pokes" in bold letters written on them.

Individual honors

Heisman Trophy, Maxwell Award, Walter Camp Award
Barry Sanders, 1988

Johnny Unitas Golden Arm Award, Bobby Bowden FCA Award
Mason Rudolph, 2017

Ray Guy Award
Matt Fodge, 2008

Fred Biletnikoff Award
Justin Blackmon, 2010 & 2011
James Washington, 2017

Lou Groza Award
Dan Bailey, 2010

Retired numbers

Cowboys in the NFL 
As of August 30, 2022.

Future non-conference opponents 
Announced schedules as of November 13, 2019.

References

External links

 

 
American football teams established in 1901
1901 establishments in Oklahoma Territory